Brandon Leake (born May 4, 1992) is a spoken word poet, educator and motivational speaker and the winner of the fifteenth season of America's Got Talent. He was the first spoken word poet to be on America's Got Talent and received the Golden Buzzer award in the first round from Howie Mandel. He performed pieces about his sister who died, his father, his mother and his daughter. He was named the champion of the 15th season on September 23 2020, going home with a $1 million cash prize, a brand new Kia Stinger and the opportunity to star in Luxor Las Vegas.

He has performed in 36 US states, New Zealand, Mexico and Canada with his Dark Side Tour to promote his published poetry and his album called Deficiencies: A Tale from My Dark Side. 
He teaches at Brookside school daycare center, where he worked with his wife. 
Leake is the founder and CEO of Called to Move, an organization that helps youth through poetry. He founded the organization in 2012 at Simpson University. He is also an academic advisor at San Joaquin Delta College. On October 9, 2020, it was announced that Leake had signed with United Talent Agency. Also in October 2020, it was announced Leake would serve as the producing partner and contributor to the Team Harmony Foundation's new international web series, HATE: WHAT ARE YOU GOING TO DO?

Leake is from Stockton, California. He is married and has one daughter who was born shortly before his first audition.

References

American poets
America's Got Talent winners
1993 births
Living people
African-American poets